Elections to Liverpool Town Council were held on Thursday 1 November 1877. One third of the council seats were up for election, the term of office of each councillor being three years.

Six of the sixteen wards were uncontested.

After the election, the composition of the council was:

Election result

Ward results

* - Retiring Councillor seeking re-election

Abercromby

Castle Street

Everton

Exchange

Great George

Lime Street

North Toxteth

Pitt Street

Rodney Street

{{Election box candidate with party link|
  |party      = Conservative Party (UK)
  |candidate  = David Radcliffe
  |votes      = ''1,006  |percentage = 56%  |change     = 
}}

St. Anne Street

St. Paul's

St. Peter's

Scotland

South Toxteth

Vauxhall

West Derby

Aldermanic Election

At the meeting of the Council on 9 November 1877, the terms of office of eight 
alderman expired.
The following eight were elected as Aldermen by the Council (Aldermen and Councillors) on 9 November 1877 for a term of six years.*''' - re-elected aldermen.

By-elections

No. 1, Everton, 2 March 1878

The death of Alderman Joseph Harrison was reported to the Council on 16 February 1878.

His place was taken by Councillor John Pearson (Conservative, Everton, elected 1 November 1875) was elected as an Alderman by the Council on 16 February 1878.

No. 16, North Toxteth, 23 May 1878

Caused by the death of Councillor William Leyland (Conservative, North Toxteth, elected 1 November 1876), which was reported to the Council on 5 June 1878.

No. 8, Pitt Street, 23 May 1878

Caused by the election of Charles Courtenay Deane (Conservative, Pitt Street, elected 23 April 1977) being declared void on 27 June 1877 under the Corrupt Practices (Municipal Elections) Act 1872 and reported to the Council on 4 July 1877..

See also

 Liverpool City Council
 Liverpool Town Council elections 1835 - 1879
 Liverpool City Council elections 1880–present
 Mayors and Lord Mayors of Liverpool 1207 to present
 History of local government in England

References

1877
1877 English local elections
1870s in Liverpool